Iroquois Gas Transmission System (also known as the Iroquois Pipeline) is a natural gas pipeline that brings gas from eastern Canada to the New York City area.

Ownership 
The Iroquois pipeline is owned by TransCanada Corporation, Dominion Resources, KeySpan Corporation, New Jersey Resources Corporation, and Energy East Corporation. Its FERC code is 110.

References

External links
Iroquois.com
Route map
Natural gas pipelines in Canada
Natural gas pipelines in the United States
Canada–United States trade relations
Natural gas pipelines in New York (state)
Transport buildings and structures in Ontario
Energy infrastructure on Long Island, New York
Transportation buildings and structures in Connecticut